Cooray or Corea is a Sinhalese surname.

Notable people
 Anuradha Cooray (born 1978), Sri Lankan runner
 Asantha Cooray (born 1973), Sri Lankan academic
 B. C. Cooray (born 1941), Sri Lankan cricket official
 Chamil Cooray, Sri Lankan carrom player 
 Cissy Cooray (1889–1965), Ceylonese social worker
 Dilhan Cooray (born 1987), Sri Lankan cricketer
 E. J. Cooray, Ceylonese politician
 Harsha Cooray (born 1983), Sri Lankan cricketer
 James Cooray Smith (born 1978), British writer
 Janani Cooray, Sri Lankan performance artist
 Malith Cooray (born 1990), Sri Lankan cricketer
 Nilantha Cooray (born 1978), Sri Lankan cricketer
 P. Andrew Cooray (1901–1998), Ceylonese politician
 Reginald Cooray (born 1947), Sri Lankan politician
 Sangeeth Cooray (born 1995), Sri Lankan cricketer
 Sirisena Cooray, Sri Lankan politician
 Tennison Cooray (born 1952), Sri Lankan actor
 Thomas Cooray (1901–1988), Sri Lankan priest
 Vernon Cooray, Swedish scientist

See also
 

Sinhalese surnames